The Customs Officers' Association of New Zealand (COA) is a trade union representing customs officers of the New Zealand Customs Service.

The COA was affiliated to the New Zealand Council of Trade Unions (NZCTU) until mid-2016.

References

Trade unions in New Zealand
Civil service trade unions